Claudine J. "Dina" Cantin (formerly Manzo and Ioannou; born March 7, 1972) is an American television personality and entrepreneur. She is most known for appearing on The Real Housewives of New Jersey as an original main cast member, appearing in that capacity from 2009-2010 and 2014, as well as her own party-planning television series Dina's Party.

Career
Born in Brooklyn, New York, the youngest of 11 children, Cantin at age six moved with her family to Wayne, New Jersey. In 2007, Cantin (then known as Dina Manzo) and her then husband Thomas Manzo appeared in an episode of VH1's My Fabulous Wedding. In 2009, Cantin appeared in the first two seasons of The Real Housewives of New Jersey, a reality series focusing on a group of women living in New Jersey, before departing. In 2014, Cantin returned for the sixth season. In 2015, she departed the series due to relocating to California. In 2011, Cantin hosted the party-planning series Dina's Party on HGTV. It was later cancelled after two seasons.

Cantin runs Project Ladybug, a nonprofit foundation that focuses on helping children diagnosed with cancer and their families pay for medical bills and other expenses.

In 2016, Cantin released a skincare product line titled Glow by Dina.

Personal life
Dina Cantin has appeared on The Real Housewives of New Jersey alongside her sister Caroline Manzo, brother Chris Laurita, and sister-in-law Jacqueline Laurita. She has one daughter, Lexi Ioannou, born January 25, 1996. In October 2012, Cantin separated from her then husband Tommy Manzo. In February 2016, their divorce was finalized.

Cantin is close friends with former co-star Teresa Giudice. She is the godmother of Giudice's daughter, Audriana.

In 2015, Cantin moved from Franklin Lakes, New Jersey to Malibu, California.

In May 2017, Cantin and her then boyfriend Dave Cantin were the victims of a robbery at her home. 

The two married the following month in June, 2017.

On December 16, 2020, Lucchese crime family soldier John Perna pled guilty to aggravated assault on Dave Cantin. Perna was hired by Thomas Manzo, who is the ex-husband of Cantin; Perna carried out the assault in exchange for a discounted price for his wedding reception.

Filmography

References

External links
 

1972 births
Living people
American people of Italian descent
The Real Housewives cast members